Hans Frauenfelder (July 28, 1922 – July 10, 2022) was an American physicist and biophysicist notable for his discovery of perturbed angular correlation (PAC) in 1951. In the modern day, PAC spectroscopy is widely used in the study of condensed matter physics. Within biophysics, he is known for his experimental and theoretical research on the dynamical behavior of protein tertiary structure.

Education
Frauenfelder received his Dr. sc. nat. in physics in 1950 at the Swiss Federal Institute of Technology (ETH) in Zurich under Paul Scherrer, his thesis being on the study of radioactive surfaces. At ETH, he was also taught by Gregor Wentzel and Wolfgang Pauli. Through Pauli, he also got to know many of the leading scientists such as Hendrik Kramers, Werner Heisenberg, Hans Jensen, and Wolfgang Paul.

Career
Frauenfelder migrated to the United States in 1952, joining the Department of Physics at the  University of Illinois at Urbana-Champaign as a research associate. He stayed at the UIUC till 1992, ultimately as Center for Advanced Study Professor of Physics, Chemistry, and Biophysics.

His research interests included nuclear physics, particle physics, conservation laws, the Mössbauer effect, and the biophysics of protein folding and motions.

Frauenfelder was a visiting Scientist at the European Organization for Nuclear Research (CERN) in 1958/59, 1963 and 1973.

In 1992, Frauenfelder moved to the Los Alamos National Laboratory where he directed the Center for Nonlinear Studies (CNLS) until 1997. In 1997, he left CNLS and joined the theoretical biology and biophysics group at Los Alamos (T-10 recently renamed T-6) and continued research in biophysics.

Frauenfelder was the inventor of the "Frauenfelder Rules", which provide a guideline about the most successful way to run a seminar at a research workshop, according to which a presentation should take up no more than 66% of the allotted time, the rest being used for questions and in-depth discussion.

Personal life
Frauenfelder died in Tesuque, New Mexico, on July 10, 2022, eighteen days away from his 100th birthday.

Honors
Frauenfelder was elected a Fellow of the American Physical society in 1961. He was a member of the National Academy of Sciences (elected in 1975), the American Philosophical Society, and a Foreign Member of the Royal Swedish Academy of Sciences.

Publications
 Thomas G. Ebrey, Hans Frauenfelder, Barry Honig, and Koji Nakanishi Biophysical Studies, University of Illinois Press (1988) 
 Hans Frauenfelder, The Mössbauer Effect, W. A. Benjamin, Inc. (1962) ASIN B000Q7QEBG
 Hans Frauenfelder and Ernest M. Henley, Subatomic Physics, Benjamin Cummings (1991)

See also
 Wolfgang Pauli
 Paul Scherrer
 Quantum Aspects of Life

References

External links
 References on Perturbed Angular Correlation (PAC)
 PAC Spectroscopy
 Frauenfelder's homepage
 Frauenfelder's math genealogy

1922 births
2022 deaths
American biophysicists
American nuclear physicists
21st-century American physicists
ETH Zurich alumni
Members of the United States National Academy of Sciences
Probability theorists
Swiss biophysicists
Swiss nuclear physicists
Swiss physicists
University of Illinois Urbana-Champaign faculty
Fellows of the American Physical Society
Members of the American Philosophical Society
Fellows of the American Academy of Arts and Sciences
Fellows of the American Association for the Advancement of Science
Members of the Royal Swedish Academy of Sciences
Los Alamos National Laboratory personnel
People associated with CERN
Swiss emigrants to the United States